Les Ondes Silencieuses (English: The Still Waters) is the third full-length album by French electronica artist Colleen (real name Cécile Schott) released on May 21, 2007. The Japanese release features three bonus live tracks. The name can be interpreted in numerous ways. It can refer to the unusual calmness of still water, sound waves, or the French expression to refer to strange animal behaviour before earthquakes.

Style
The album was made using natural instruments played live, thus keeping with the unsampled style of Schott's last few albums. Her penchant for unusual instrumentation was again evident, with the spinet and viola da gamba making appearances alongside the more familiar classical guitar and clarinet. The use of the viola da gamba was inspired by a 15-year-old Schott viewing Tous les matins du monde, a French film (adapted from a novel of the same name) based on the life of Marin Marais who played the instrument.

The looped aesthetic that had characterised much of Colleen's earlier work was discarded on this release in favour of a more open-ended and unstructured approach.

A marine theme is apparent in the name of many of the tracks and in the name of the album itself.

Track listing
All songs were composed and played by Cécile Schott.

"This Place In Time" – 2:33
"Le Labyrinthe" – 5:15
"Sun Against My Eyes" – 4:22
"Les Ondes Silencieuses" – 6:09
"Blue Sands" – 5:16
"Echoes And Coral" – 3:09
"Sea Of Tranquility" – 5:46
"Past The Long Black Land" – 3:41
"Le Bateau" – 7:09

Bonus Japanese tracks
<li>"Unfold Out" – 5:36
<li>"Serpentine" – 6:04
<li>"I'll Read You A Story" – 5:18

"Unfold Out" and "Serpentine" were recorded live in Asahi Art Square, Tokyo.

Credits

Instrumentation
 Cécile Schott – clarinet (tracks 3, 7), classical guitar (tracks 3, 7), singing bowls (track 6), spinet (track 2) and viola da gamba (tracks 1, 4, 5, 8, 9).

Production credits
 Composed by Cécile Schott
 Produced by Cécile Schott and Emiliano Flores
 Mixed by Cécile Schott and Emiliano Flores
 Recorded by Cécile Schott (tracks 1, 2, 5, 6, 8) and Emiliano Flores (tracks 3, 4, 5, 7, 9)
 Mastering by Emiliano Flores
 Artwork by Iker Spozio

External links
 Official Leaf Label page for the album
 
 

Colleen (musician) albums
2007 albums
The Leaf Label albums